Alankash (also Romanized as Ālankash; also known as Alangesh and Alankesh) is a village in Sanjabad-e Shomali Rural District, in the Central District of Kowsar County, Ardabil Province, Iran. At the 2006 census, its population was 194, in 33 families.

References 

Tageo.com

Towns and villages in Kowsar County